Events in the year 1891 in India.

Incumbents
 Empress of India – Queen Victoria
 Viceroy of India – Henry Petty-Fitzmaurice, 5th Marquess of Lansdowne
 The Queen of The Green River
14 April – B. R. Ambedkar, nationalist, jurist, Dalit political leader and a Buddhist revivalist (d.1956).

Events
 National income - 5,304 million

Law
Easements Act
Bankers Books Evidence Act
Mail Ships Act (British statute)
Coinage Act (British statute)

References

 
India
Years of the 19th century in India